Kahn or Kahan in Iran, may refer to:
 Kahan, Isfahan
 Kahn, Anbarabad, Kerman Province
 Kahn, Kerman, Kerman Province
 Kahan, Kuhbanan, Kerman Province
 Kahn, Ravar, Kerman Province
 Kahn-e Biduri, Kerman Province
 Kahn-e Nowruz, Kerman Province
 Kahn-e Safar, Kerman Province
 Kahan, Iran, Razavi Khorasan Province
 Kahn-e Bala (disambiguation)
 Kahn-e Nuk (disambiguation)
 Kahn-e Pain

See also
 Kahn is a common element in Iranian placenames; see .
 Kahan is a common element in Iranian placenames; see .
Khan, Iran (disambiguation)